Lemuropisum edule (Malagasy:Tara) is an edible wild plant native to south west Madagascar. Family Fabaceae subfamily Caesalpinioideae
  
The scientific name Lemuropisum edule means edible lemur's pea. The plant  grow at altitudes between 15–100 m, only in semi-arid tropical zones of Madagascar with annual rainfall less than 400 mm.

The species is currently under investigation as a potential nut crop in Western Australia.

Description

Unarmed, multistemmed, much branched, spreading shrub up to 4–6 m tall, crown dense, branchlets sometimes spine-like. Leaves sparse, semi-persistent, paripinnate, with 1-4 pairs of oval to suborbicular leaflets, 3.5–6 mm wide. Inflorescence a raceme; flowers bisexual, with 4 white petals and 1 tinged yellow. Fruit pendent, subcylindric, depressed between the seeds, 20–30 cm long, 2 cm wide, 2-valved, valves membraneous, dehiscent; seeds 6-12, ovoid-reniform, 2.5 cm long, 1.6 cm across, testa thin and brittle.

Cultivation

Not cultivated in Madagascar. In Australia, after soaking the seeds for 10 hours, germination is rapid. Alkaline soils preferred. Nuts (seeds) are harvested from the ground following dehiscence. Nuts eaten raw, discarding the brittle testa, the cotyledons agreeably sweet with a cashew-like flavour, smooth consistency and a flexible, rather plastic texture. Apparently not used in cooking; when eaten green the flavour reminiscent of fresh garden peas.

Nutritional value

The nuts contain 38-43% available carbohydrates, 26-32% unavailable carbohydrates, 14-16% protein and 6-9% fat, comparing favourably with those of Cordeauxia edulis. However, the ingestion of 100 g kernels, ca. 84 raw seeds, may inhibit human production of chymotrypsin and cause digestive upsets, although this could possibly be reduced by cooking or roasting the seeds.

Notes

Caesalpinioideae